The Dunes Club is a historic private beach club at 137 Boston Neck Road in Narragansett, Rhode Island.  The club occupies  of land fronting Narragansett Bay in central Narragansett, bounded on the north by the Pettaquamscutt River.

History 
The Dunes Club's centerpiece is a large rambling Colonial Revival clubhouse designed by Thomas Pym Cope and built in 1939, after the first clubhouse (built 1928-29 to a design by club member Kenneth Murchison), was washed away by the New England Hurricane of 1938.  The only element of the club's original buildings to survive that hurricane is its gatehouse.  The club's facilities include tennis courts and cabanas.

The club was listed on the National Register of Historic Places in 2015.

On 18 May 2016 around 6:30 p.m., an SUV crashed into the gatehouse at the entrance of the club. Steve Sterling, the manager of the club, as well as his wife and his teenage son Erik, were inside at the time but were unharmed. The house sustained significant structural damage as well as water damage.

Facilities and amenities 

The Dunes Club consists of a main clubhouse, which includes a gift shop, formal dining hall with a stage and dance floor, indoor/outdoor formal bar, tea room used for small formal events, casual restaurant with deck dining, restrooms, kitchens and staff offices and living quarters. From the north side entrance of the clubhouse or through the parking lot is access to a casual snack bar offering lunch foods as well as ice cream, an outdoor snack bar, a casual outdoor food service, deck, pool, children's pool and two bars. Further down are the member bathhouses, which are small units for storing chairs and umbrellas, and the headquarters of the bathhouse staff who carry chairs and umbrellas for members. Located in proximity to the beach is the first aid center, where medical supplies are stored, and the children's camp, a day camp for those ages 4 and older. Further down and closer to Narrow River are member cabanas. These are small rooms with ground-level porches that have chairs and tables for relaxation and dining as well as storage for chairs, umbrellas and surfboards. These are staffed by two cabana stations, and cabana lease holders have access to a special cabana menu that changes daily. Bordering the parking lot and Narrow River, respectively, are four clay tennis courts and four asphalt tennis courts. Adjoining the asphalt courts is the pro shop, which sells rackets, balls, and other tennis equipment to members. A tennis pro and multiple instructors are employed each summer to offer private lessons, group clinics, and day camps for children.

List of presidents 
 T. Pierrepont Hazard (1929–1941)
 Henry B. Spencer (1942–1954)
 Caryl Roberts (1954–1955)
 Robert O. Lord (1955–1959)
 John E. C. Hall (1959–1961)
 R. Henry Field (1961–1963)
 Darius L. Goff (1963–1967)
 George C. Davis (1967–1971)
 George S. Squibb (1971–1988)
 James S. Smith (1988–1992)
 Edward O. Ekman (1992–1996)
 James M. Seed (1996–2001)
Michael E. McMahon (2001– )

See also
National Register of Historic Places listings in Washington County, Rhode Island

References

External links
The Dunes Club web site

Clubhouses on the National Register of Historic Places in Rhode Island
Colonial Revival architecture in Rhode Island
Buildings and structures in Narragansett, Rhode Island
National Register of Historic Places in Washington County, Rhode Island